The Communauté urbaine de Dunkerque is the communauté urbaine, an intercommunal structure, centred on the city of Dunkirk. It is located in the Nord department, in the Hauts-de-France region, northern France. It was created in October 1968. Its area is 299.9 km2. Its population was 195,917 in 2018, of which 86,865 in Dunkirk proper.

Composition
The communauté urbaine consists of the following 17 communes:

Armbouts-Cappel
Bourbourg
Bray-Dunes
Cappelle-la-Grande
Coudekerque-Branche
Craywick
Dunkirk
Ghyvelde
Grande-Synthe
Grand-Fort-Philippe
Gravelines
Leffrinckoucke
Loon-Plage
Saint-Georges-sur-l'Aa
Spycker
Téteghem-Coudekerque-Village
Zuydcoote

References

Dunkerque
Dunkerque